The Troubadour is a nightclub located in West Hollywood, California, United States, at 9081 Santa Monica Boulevard just east of Doheny Drive and the border of Beverly Hills.  Inspired by a visit to the newly opened Troubadour café in London, it was opened in 1957 by Doug Weston as a coffee house on La Cienega Boulevard, then moved to its current location shortly after opening and has remained open continuously since. It was a major center for folk music in the 1960s, and subsequently for singer-songwriters and rock. In 2011, a documentary about the club, Troubadours: Carole King / James Taylor & The Rise of the Singer-Songwriter, was released.

History

1960s 
The Troubadour played an important role in the careers of Hoyt Axton, Jackson Browne, the Byrds, Neil Diamond, Elton John, Eagles, Carole King, Love, Joni Mitchell, Van Morrison, Bonnie Raitt, Linda Ronstadt, J. D. Souther, James Taylor, Tom Waits, and other prominent and successful performers, who played performances there establishing their future fame.

In October 1962, comedian Lenny Bruce was arrested on obscenity charges for using the word "schmuck" on stage; one of the arresting officers was Sherman Block, who would later become Los Angeles County Sheriff. Michael Nesmith sometimes worked as an M.C. at the club in the 1960s, before the formation of the music group the Monkees.  Buffalo Springfield debuted at the club in 1966, and Randy Newman started out there as well.

1970s 
On August 25, 1970, Neil Diamond (who had just recorded his first live album at the Troubadour) introduced Elton John, who performed his first show in the United States at the Troubadour. Comics Cheech & Chong and Steve Martin were discovered there in the early 1970s. In 1974, John Lennon, Harry Nilsson and Ringo Starr were ejected from the club for drunkenly heckling the Smothers Brothers. That same year, Bruce Springsteen and the E-Street Band performed third on the bill with ex-Byrd Roger McGuinn headlining, going on stage at 1:45 in the morning. In 1975, Elton John returned to do a series of special anniversary concerts. In November 2007, James Taylor and Carole King played a series of concerts commemorating the nightclub's 50th anniversary and reuniting the two from their 1970 performance.

The Troubadour featured new wave and punk in the late 1970s and early 1980s, including Bad Religion, Flipper, The Meat Puppets, Napalm Death, and Redd Kross. L.A. residents and proto-grunge band Melvins have played the Troubadour stage 24 times and counting as of November 2019, including live tapings for Carson Daly in 2012 and 2015. The club features in the 1972 film Cisco Pike.

1980s 
In the 1980s the club became associated with glam metal bands such as Candy, Cinderella, Guns N' Roses, L.A. Guns, Mötley Crüe, Poison, Ratt, Warrant, NEWHAVEN and W.A.S.P. Guns N' Roses played their first show at the Troubadour, and were also discovered by a David Geffen A&R representative at the club. During the glam and metal years, Gina Barsamian was the primary booking agent for the club. It continued to attract non-glam metal acts through this time and into the 1990s such as Fiona Apple, Steve Earle, Mudhoney, Silverchair and Radiohead.

21st century 
In the 21st century, the venue is well known for promoting artists as diverse as Arctic Monkeys, Bastille, Billy Talent, Jason Mraz, Coldplay, Franz Ferdinand, Kina Grannis, Ray LaMontagne, Lawson, the Libertines, Melt Banana, Metz, Joanna Newsom, and Orville Peck. Rise Against filmed at the club five nights in a row for a DVD, Generation Lost. On April 1, 2016, it saw the first show of Guns N' Roses since Slash and Duff McKagan had rejoined the band. Busted's first show as a reformed band in America was performed at the Troubadour in June 2017. The first concert of Grace VanderWaal's first national tour was held at the Troubadour on November 5, 2017. 2006 Sheriff Dept was called against BRIGHTBLACK MORNING LIGHT as feedback echoed from Soundbooth. Stone Temple Pilots' first live performance with their newest singer Jeff Gutt was held in November 2017.

Like many small businesses and music venues, the Troubadour has struggled during the COVID-19 pandemic; it launched a GoFundMe page in May 2020, which raised $70,000.   In August, Elton John celebrated his 50th anniversary of playing the venue, and expressed his concern about the survival of the nightclub. The comedian Bill Burr has hosted two of his Monday Morning Podcasts from the venue to raise money during the pandemic by selling limited edition signed posters.

References

External links

Live Music Calendar
HarryNilsson.com Article About the "Troubadour Incident"
 – TV programme about the influential club and artist scene, on the BBC (2011)

Music venues in Los Angeles
Nightclubs in Los Angeles County, California
Buildings and structures in West Hollywood, California
Landmarks in Los Angeles
Music venues completed in 1957
1957 establishments in California